St. Benedict is an unincorporated community and census-designated place (CDP) in Prairie Township, Kossuth County, Iowa, United States. As of the 2010 census it had a population of 39.

St. Benedict was platted in 1899.

Geography

Demographics

References

Census-designated places in Kossuth County, Iowa
1899 establishments in Iowa
Populated places established in 1899